The covered wagon or prairie wagon, historically also referred to as an ambulance, a whitetop, or a prairie schooner, was a vehicle usually made out of wood and canvas that was used for transportation, prominently in 19th-century America. With roots in the heavy Conestoga wagon developed for the rough, undeveloped roads and paths of the colonial East, the covered wagon spread west with American migration. The Conestoga wagon was far too heavy for westward expansion. Typical farm wagons were merely covered for westward expansion and heavily relied upon along such travel routes as the Great Wagon Road, the Mormon Trail and the Santa Fe and Oregon Trails, covered wagons carried settlers seeking land, gold, and new futures ever further west.

Throughout the 20th century, the covered wagon grew to become an icon of the American West.

History 

Once breached, the moderate terrain and fertile land between the Appalachians and the Mississippi was rapidly settled. In the mid-nineteenth century thousands of Americans took a wide variety of farm wagons across the Great Plains from developed parts of the Midwest to places in the West such as California, Oregon, Utah, Colorado, and Montana. Overland migrants typically fitted any sturdy wagon with several wooden or metal bows which arched high over the bed. Over this was stretched canvas or similar sturdy cloth, creating the distinctive covered wagon silhouette.

Prairie schooner is a fanciful name for the covered wagon, drawing on their broad white canvas covers, romantically envisioned as the sails of a ship crossing the sea.

For "overlanders" migrating westward, covered wagons were a more common mode of transportation than wheelbarrow, stagecoach, or train. Oxen were the most common draft animal for pulling covered wagons, although mules and horses were also used. Authors of guidebooks written for emigrants noted that oxen were more reliable, less expensive, and nearly as fast as other options.

Gallery

See also
American frontier
Chuck wagon
Conestoga wagon
Wagon
Conestoga horse
Great Wagon Road
Mormon Trail

References

Bibliography
John David Unruh, Jr., The Plains Across: The Overland Emigrants and the Trans-Mississippi West, 1840-1860 (University of Illinois Press, 1979: first unabridged paperback ed., 1993).

External links
 

American frontier
Demographic history of the United States
History of United States expansionism
History of road transport
Wagons
Western (genre) staples and terminology